Tridentiger is a genus of fish in the subfamily of gobies called the Gobionellinae, known commonly as the tripletooth gobies.

These fish are native to the coastal waters of China, Japan, and Korea, where they live in brackish habitat types. They are often dominant members of the local fish fauna. Some are known as invasive species in North America.

These gobies are generally under 10 centimeters long. They have tricuspid outer teeth on their upper and lower jaws.

Species
There are currently 9 recognized species in this genus:
 Tridentiger barbatus Günther, 1861 (Shokihaze goby)
 Tridentiger bifasciatus Steindachner, 1881 (Shimofuri goby)
 Tridentiger brevispinis Katsuyama, R. Arai & M. Nakamura, 1972
 Tridentiger kuroiwae D. S. Jordan & S. Tanaka (I), 1927
 Tridentiger microsquamis H. W. Wu, 1931
 Tridentiger nudicervicus Tomiyama, 1934 (Bare-naped goby)
 Tridentiger obscurus Temminck & Schlegel, 1845 (Dusky tripletooth goby)
 Tridentiger radiatus R. F. Cui, Y. S. Pan, X. M. Yang & Y. Y. Wang, 2013 
 Tridentiger trigonocephalus T. N. Gill, 1859 (Chameleon goby)

References

Gobionellinae